Alleycat Scratch was an American glam metal band formed in San Francisco, California, United States, in 1988. The band never gained popularity or commercial success due to the grunge movement of the 1990s. Their music has been considered highly underrated. The band has only released two albums to date. Their debut album, Deadboys in Trash City, has been considered some of the best sleaze rock of the period. Alleycat Scratch disbanded in 1994.

Past members
Tommy Haight - lead vocals
Devin Lovelace - lead guitars and vocals
Justin Sayne - rhythm guitar and vocals
Bobby "Boa" Dias - bass guitar and vocals
Michael Joyce - drums
Robbi Black - drums
Michael Michelle - lead vocals
Eddie Robison - lead vocals

Discography
Deadboys in Trash City - 1993
Last Call - 2009

References

External links
 

Glam metal musical groups from California